Liang (Romanization used in China) is an East Asian surname of Chinese origin. The surname is often transliterated as Leung (in Hong Kong) or Leong (in Macau, Hong Kong, Malaysia, Singapore, and the Philippines) according to its Cantonese and Hakka pronunciation, Neo / Nio / Niu (Hokkien, Teochew, Hainan), or Liong (Fuzhou). In Indonesia, it is known as Liang or Nio. It is also common in Korea, where it is written Ryang (량) or Yang (양).  In Vietnam, it's pronounced as Lương.

It is listed 128th in the classic text Hundred Family Surnames. In 2019 it was the 22nd most common surname in Mainland China. In comparison, it is the 7th most common surname in Hong Kong, where it is usually written Leung or Leong.

History
During the reign of the Zhou dynasty King Xuan of Zhou (827–782 bc), Qin Zhong set out on an expedition to subdue the peoples to the west in Central Asia. After Qin Zhong died, the King divided the area of Shang among them, the second son of Qin Zhong received the area around Liangshan County, from which his descendants developed the surname Liang.

Notable people with the surname 梁

American 

 Awonder Liang

Chinese
Jack Neo, Chinese name: 梁智強， film director.
Lily Neo, Singapore politician.
Neo Ao Tiew,  businessman, philanthropist and sheriff.
Neo Beng Siang, professional basketball coach from Singapore.
Alan Leong (Chinese name; 梁家傑) , Senior Counsel and former member of the Legislative Council of Hong Kong
Andrew Leung, President of the Legislative Council of Hong Kong
Antony Leung, banker and former Financial Secretary of Hong Kong
Neoh Bean Chye, Malaysian gunman executed in Singapore 
Bryan Leung, Hong Kong martial arts actor and director
Liang Chen, professional tennis player
Liang Cheng, Qing dynasty ambassador to the United States
Christine Liang, Taiwanese-born president and founder of ASI Corp., Fremont, California
CY Leung The third Chief Executive of the Hong Kong Special Administrative Region
Edmond Leung (Chinese name; 梁漢文) , Hong Kong Singer, actor and a quarter of Big Four and a finalist of the 8th annual New Talent Singing Awards
Edwaard Liang, Taiwanese-born American choreographer, ballet dancer with Morphoses/The Wheeldon Company and former soloist with New York City Ballet
Edwin Leong, Hong Kong billionaire businessman
Elsie Leung, solicitor and former Secretary for Justice of Hong Kong
Leung Foon, Student of Wong Fei-Hung
Fish Leong, Malaysian-born Mandopop singer
Gigi Leung, Hong Kong Cantopop singer and actress
Liang Heng, Chinese ex-pat writer and scholar
Isabella Leong, Hong Kong-based Macanese actress and former singer
Katie Leung, Scottish film, television and stage actress
Ken Leung, American film and television actor
Lawrence Leung, Australian comedian, writer and director 
Lawrence Liang, Indian legal researcher and lawyer 
Lei Liang, Chinese-born American composer
Martin Leung, American pianist
Matthew H. Liang, American physician scientist
Leung Jan, Wing Chun practitioner and Chinese herbal doctor from Foshan
Leung Kwok-hung, Hong Kong activist, politician and Member of the Legislative Council of Hong Kong
Liang Guanglie, Minister of National Defense in the People's Republic of China and serves as a general in the People's Liberation Army of China
Liang May Seen, first woman of Chinese descent to live in Minnesota, community leader in Minneapolis
Liang Qichao, Chinese scholar, philosopher, journalist and reformist
Liang Shan Shan, Malaysian student murdered in Singapore in 1989
Liang Shih-Chiu, (1903–1987), Chinese educator, writer, translator, literary theorist and lexicographer
Leong Siew Chor, Singaporean convicted killer
Stephen Wing Hong Leung, Chinese-Canadian bishop of the Anglican Network in Canada
Liang Wenbo, snooker player
Liang Wengen, founder and main shareholder of Sany Group and one of the wealthiest men in China
Roseanne Liang, Chinese-New Zealand film director
Toby Leung, Hong Kong television actress
Tony Leung (Leung Chiu Wai), Hong Kong actor and singer
Tony Leung (Leung Ka Fai), Hong Kong actor
Liang Xiaosheng, Chinese novelist and screenwriter
Liang Xueming, footballer
Liang Xueqing, Chinese painter, magazine editor

Filipino
Ronnie Liang, Filipino singer
Francisco Tongio Liongson, Early Filipino politician
Pedro Tongio Liongson, Early Filipino politician
Francisco Alonso Liongson, Filipino playwright

Thai
Luang Wichitwathakan, born Kim Liang (金良), Thai politician, diplomat, historian, novelist, and playwright. Led committee to rename Siam to Thailand.

Vietnamese
Lương Thế Vinh, Vietnamese scholar and mathematician
Luong Kim Dinh, (15 June 1914 - 25 March 1997) was a Vietnamese catholic priest, scholar and philosopher
Luong Bich Huu, Vietnamese singer

Indonesian 

 Nio Joe Lan, Indonesian historian

See also
Yang (Korean surname), notable Korean people with the last name Yang.

References

Chinese-language surnames
Individual Chinese surnames